John Perrin may refer to:
John Perrin (American sportsman) (1898–1969, American baseball and football player
John Perrin (translator) (1558–1615), English churchman and academic
John Draper Perrin (1890–1967), Canadian entrepreneur, mining executive and civic leader
Johnny Perrin (born 1983), musician
John Gordon Perrin (born 1989), Canadian volleyball player

See also
John Perring (disambiguation)
Jack Perrin (1896–1967), actor
Nig Perrine (John Perrine, 1885–1948), American baseball infielder